Nacolomab tafenatox is a mouse monoclonal antibody. The antibody itself, nacolomab, is fused with enterotoxin A from Staphylococcus aureus (which is reflected by 'tafenatox' in the drug's name).

See also
 Naptumomab estafenatox, a drug with a similar chemical structure and mechanism

References

Monoclonal antibodies for tumors
Antibody-drug conjugates